Blanca Avelina Treviño de Vega (Monterrey, Nuevo León, Mexico) is president and executive director of Softtek, a Mexican information and communication technologies company, the largest independent service provider in Latin America.

Education 
Treviño earned her bachelor's in 1981 in computer systems administration at the Monterrey Institute of Technology and Higher Studies, Monterrey Campus. At first, she regretted choosing the major, as all her classmates were men and she was intimidated. However, her father had already started to brag about how his daughter was studying the then new field and told her that he could not accept a daughter who was afraid. So, she stuck with it.

Career 
A part-time job at Alfa, one of Monterrey's biggest companies, convinced her to think bigger. When the company downsized and laid her off, the idea to form her own company emerged  In 1982, she co-founded Softtek with $10,000 and nine partners, who dreamed of having a global enterprise. It has since grown to have more than 12,000 employees, and thirty offices in Latin America, Europe and Asia. Softtek also has major centers in Monterrey, Ensenada, Aguascalientes and Mexico City in Mexico as well as in Sao Paulo, Brazil; La Coruña, Spain; Wuxi, China; La Plata, Argentina; Bogotá, Colombia; Dallas, TX; and Bangalore, India. The company's presence in the United States came through a Treviño initiative called "Near shore" to provide outsourcing, taking advantage of Mexico's geographic proximity.

Since 2000, she has been the general director of the company and the president of the executive board. Previously, she held positions as "team leader," vice president of sales and marketing as well as general director of operations in the United States.

Currently, Softtek has over a thousand computer professionals who provide services to the United States.

Associations 
Treviño is vice president of the Mexican Business Council and a board member of Walmart Mexico, Grupo Lala and the Mexican Stock Exchange, as well as the Universidad de Monterrey and the Universidad Tec Milenio (ITESM) and Confederación Patronal de la República Mexicana (COPARMEX).

Recognition 
In 2009, CNN Expansión magazine named her as one of the 50 most powerful women in Mexico, ranking her fourth.  In 2011, the Endeavor organization for the development of new entrepreneurs also recognized her career in this field.

Treviño was the first woman to be inducted into the "Outsourcing Hall of Fame"of the International Association of Outsourcing (IAOP).

In 2014, she was the first woman to be included in the Consejo Mexicano de Negocios, which caused them to change their name from Consejo Mexicano de Hombres de Negocios. In 2018, Educando (formerly Worldfund) recognized Blanca with the "Education Leadership Award" for her contributions and influence in improving education in Mexico. Treviño was inducted into the Women in Technology Hall of Fame.

References 

Living people
Businesspeople from Nuevo León
Monterrey Institute of Technology and Higher Education alumni
Year of birth missing (living people)